Layalestan (also Romanized as Layālestān, Līālestān, and Līyālestān; also known as Leyarestān, Līārestān, and Līarestān) is a village in Layalestan Rural District, in the Central District of Lahijan County, Gilan Province, Iran. At the 2006 census, its population was 1,851, in 558 families.

References 

Populated places in Lahijan County